Leningradsky Prospekt, or Leningrad Avenue, is a major arterial avenue in Moscow, Russia. It continues the path of Tverskaya Street and 1st Tverskaya-Yamskaya Street north-west from Belorussky Rail Terminal, and changes the name once again to Leningrad Highway past the Sokol metro station. The Highway continues its way to Saint Petersburg via Tver (not unlike Moskovsky Prospekt in Saint Petersburg, which is named after, and leads to, Moscow).

Until 1957, Leningradsky Prospekt was part of Leningrad Highway (Petersburg Highway prior to 1924). Both avenues retain their Lenin-related names after the reinstatement of the historical Saint Petersburg name.

History

The old road to Tver, changing its course over Middle Ages, settled in its present site in the 16th century. The name Peterburskoye Schosse (Highway) was established when the road was properly paved between 1786 and 1790.

The most important historical building on the road, Gothic Revival Petrovsky Palace, was built in 1776–1780 by Matvey Kazakov as the last station of royal journeys from Saint Petersburg to Moscow. Coaches for lesser classes arrived and departed from Vsekhsvyatskoye village near present-day Sokol metro station.

In the 1830s, general Alexander Bashilov, then employed by the Governor of Moscow, planned the first regular grid of city streets north from Petrovsky Palace; two streets in the area still retain Bashilov's name. Territories south of the highway - Khodynka Field - were used mostly for military training. Bashilov also laid down the boulevards along the highway; some of them remain to date. Soon, the beginning of Petersburg Highway turned into an upper-class recreation area, with country restaurants and racetrack (completed in 1883). Smolensky Rail station (forerunner of present-day Belorussky Rail Terminal) was inaugurated in 1870. Between 1882 and 1896, Khodynka housed the national Exhibition of Industry and Arts, later transferred to the Nizhny Novgorod fairground.

In the 1890s-1900s, the highway was gradually urbanized, with factories and residential quarters, ranging from working-class barracks to luxury country homes of the Morozov family, Nikolay Eichenwald and Fyodor Schechtel.

Modern history

The Sokol Settlement of single-family homes, built in early 1920s near the junction of Petersburg and Volokolamsk highway, remains one of the last two single-family neighborhoods in Moscow (the other one is Serebryany Bor).

Since the 1910s, Khodynka has been used as Moscow's airfield, and housed Moscow's Central Airport until the 1950s; irregular DOSAAF flights continued until the 1980s. Leningradsky Highway (beyond city limits) is now home to Sheremetyevo Airport, the largest airport in Moscow, which makes the avenue connecting the city center with the highway an even more important street in Moscow. Local transportation developed from trams (1901–2005) to trolleybuses (1933) and subway (1938).

Leningradsky Prospekt itself is home to the future Dynamo Stadium and CSKA Moscow's winter and basketball arenas. Educational institutions include:
 Moscow Aviation Institute
 State Financial Academy
 Moscow Automobile Road Institute
 Moscow Food Institute

Notable buildings include the Triumph-Palace skyscraper and the 1730s baroque Church of All Saints (photographs) near the Sokol station. Its bell tower is one of Russia's leaning towers.

Highway construction, 2005–2008

Since 2005, the city of Moscow is engaged in a multi-billion project of converting Leningradsky arterial, from downtown Tverskaya Street to MKAD, into a 12-lane, non-stop freeway with frontage roads. Authorities declare the goal is improving transportation to remote districts beyond MKAD and Sheremetyevo Airport, however, the worst bottleneck on the road, in the city of Khimki, is not addressed at all. In addition, the project began with irreversible destruction of the public tram route along the Prospekt. In March, 2006, the approved project stages were valued at 57 billion roubles (2.1 billion US Dollars) ; the city has placed an absolute cap on this project at 1 trillion roubles (38 billion US dollars).

The plan includes the following stages (from city center to MKAD):
 Central segment (starting Q2, 2007 to be completed 2009) 
 Redevelopment of Pushkin Square with tunnels and shopping space
 Redevelopment of Triumphalnaya Square
 Redevelopment of Belorussky Rail Terminal Square
 Tunnel between Pushkin Square and Belorussky Rail Terminal
 Rearranging traffic in parallel Brestky Streets, Bronnaya Streets etc.
 Leningradsky Prospekt segment
 Additional overpass at the Third Ring crossing (completed 2006)
 Tunnel near Dinamo (Metro) (completed December 2006)
 Tunnel near Aeroport (Metro) with ramps to Khodynka residential district (completed February, 2007 )
 Raised overpass connecting the Prospekt with Leningradsky Highway (to be completed 2008)
 Leningradsky Highway segment (not completed 2013)
 Redevelopment near Voykovskaya
 Non-stop crossing with Festivalnaya Street
 Construction of a second five-lane Leningradsky Bridge
 Rebuilding MKAD crossing (completed 2013)

So far, there are no definite plans of reconstructing the highway in Khimki. There are plans to build a bypass private toll road to the airport currently in design stage.

Public transportation access

Daytime traffic is frequently paralyzed by construction detours, thus the only reliable transportation is through Zamoskvoretskaya Line of Moscow Metro (Belorusskaya to Sokol).

References
  П.В.Сытин, "Из истории московских улиц", М, 1948
 Construction schedule in English
 Pushkin Square Under Threat - The Moscow Times
 Pushkin Square tunnel - The Guardian

External links

Streets in Moscow